Andreas Andrea James Arestidou (born 6 December 1989) is an English professional footballer who plays as a goalkeeper who plays for Fleetwood Town. He attended Lancaster Royal Grammar School and was a member of the school cricket team, he was well known for his hostile yet accurate bowling style. Also played for Westgate Cricket Club on the few occasions he was available.

Playing career
Arestidou made his debut first team appearance against AFC Telford United at the New Bucks Head in a mid-season Shropshire FA Cup Final 2–1 win on 17 November 2009. Arestidou then made his league debut in a match in the 2009–10 season, starting in the Shrews' 1–1 draw at home to Bury. He was a regular in the reserve team during the 2008–09 season.

He was released on 14 May 2010.

He then joined Preston on trial and played in the pre-season friendly against Chorley. Arestidou then signed a one-year deal. Despite him not appearing for the first team in 2010–11, he did enough to earn an additional year's contract and broke into the first team after first choice goalkeeper Iain Turner broke a toe. He made his competitive debut for Preston in a League Cup game at Charlton on 13 September 2011, keeping a clean sheet, before going on to be on the winning side in five of his seven senior Preston appearances. The most notable match was a Football League Trophy game against his home town club which went to penalties. After gifting a goal to Morecambe in normal time, he kept Preston in the cup by saving two consecutive penalties from Izak Reid and Kevin Ellison, either of which would have won the match for Morecambe after misses by his teammates Clarke Carlisle and Ian Ashbee respectively.

Following an injury to first choice goalkeeper, Turner's foot, Arestidou became first choice during Turner absence. However, it was short lived as he was replaced by signing Thorsten Stuckmann, after Arestidou conceded five goals against Charlton in a 5–2 loss. In May 2012, Arestidou was released from the club after being told his contract would not be renewed.

References

External links

1989 births
Living people
English Football League players
Blackburn Rovers F.C. players
Lancaster City F.C. players
Nantwich Town F.C. players
Newcastle United F.C. players
Shrewsbury Town F.C. players
Preston North End F.C. players
Morecambe F.C. players
Association football goalkeepers
English footballers